is a former Japanese football player.

Playing career
Ujihara was born in Kagawa Prefecture on May 10, 1981. He joined J1 League club Nagoya Grampus Eight from youth team in 2000. However he could not play at all in the match. In 2001, he moved to J2 League club Albirex Niigata on loan. In 2001, he became a regular player and scored 15 goals. In 2002, he played many matches as substitute forward. In 2003, he returned to Nagoya Grampus Eight. However he could not play many matches until 2004. In 2005, he moved to J2 club Sagan Tosu and played many matches. In 2006, he moved to J2 club Montedio Yamagata and played many matches. In 2007, he moved to J2 club Thespa Kusatsu. He played many matches as regular player in 2007. However his opportunity to play decreased from 2008 and he retired end of 2010 season.

Club statistics

References

External links

1981 births
Living people
Association football people from Kagawa Prefecture
Japanese footballers
J1 League players
J2 League players
Nagoya Grampus players
Albirex Niigata players
Sagan Tosu players
Montedio Yamagata players
Thespakusatsu Gunma players
Association football forwards